Raja Bakthi is a 1960 Tamil-language historical fiction epic film, written by V. C. Gopal Rathnam and directed by K. Vembu. The film stars Sivaji Ganesan, Vyjayanthimala and P. Bhanumathi, with T. S. Balaiah, Padmini, Pandari Bai, M. N. Nambiar, E. V. Saroja and Stunt Somu as the ensemble cast, and was produced by P. Rajamanickam Chettiar of Nandhi Pictures. The film's music was composed by G. Govindarajulu Naidu and was filmed by R. Sampath. The film, released on 27 May 1960, was a box office failure.

Plot 

The film is about an ambitious Queen who makes an unsuccessful attempt to rule her country by eliminating the King and Prince with the help of her Army Commander. General Vikranthan rescues the young prince and plans to retake the throne from the usurper and place the rightful heir on it.

Cast 
Sivaji Ganesan as General Vikrangadhan
Vyjayanthimala as Princess Mrinalini
P. Bhanumathi as Empress Maharasai
Padmini as Queen Sarojini
Pandari Bai as Princess Devasena
T. S. Balaiah  as King Dhurjeyan
M. N. Nambiar as General
E. V. Saroja as Dancer
Stunt Somu as Prince's bodyguard

Soundtrack 
The music was composed by G. Govindarajulu Naidu, while the lyrics were penned by Ponmudi, A. Maruthakasi, Tamizh Azhagan and Ku. Rajavelu.

References

External links 
 

1960 films
1960s Tamil-language films
Films about royalty
Indian black-and-white films